The Abbot Constantine (French: L'abbé Constantin) is a 1925 French silent comedy film directed by Julien Duvivier and starring Jean Coquelin, Pierre Stéphen and Claude France. It is based on the novel The Abbot Constantine by Ludovic Halévy. The novel was remade as a sound film in 1933.

A French Catholic Priest is horrified when he learns that two Protestant American women have moved in nearby. However he is soon on good terms with them, and his nephew eventually falls in love with one of them.

Cast
 Jean Coquelin as L'abbé Constantin  
 Pierre Stéphen as Paul de Lavardens  
 Claude France as Mrs. Scott  
 Georges Lannes as Jean Reynaud  
 Geneviève Cargese as Bettina Percival  
  as Comtesse de Lavardens  
 Georges Deneubourg as Comte de Larnac  
 Angèle Decori as Pauline  
 Roberto Pia as Bernard, le jardinier
 Robby Guichard 
 Lionel Salem

References

Bibliography 
 Goble, Alan. The Complete Index to Literary Sources in Film. Walter de Gruyter, 1999.

External links 
 

1925 films
French silent feature films
1920s French-language films
Films directed by Julien Duvivier
French black-and-white films
French comedy films
1925 comedy films
Silent comedy films
1920s French films